The Namco System N2 arcade platform runs on an nForce2-based motherboard that NVIDIA developed. It is based on a NVIDIA GeForce graphics card, using the OpenGL API.

Both Namco System N2 and Namco System ES1 use the Linux operating system that is based on Debian.

The Namco System ES2 PLUS and Namco System ES3 run Windows Embedded 7 as their operating system. It runs in an arcade game cabinet designed by Bandai Namco Games.

The Namco System BNA1 is a relatively new arcade board that runs Windows 10 IoT. A less powerful version of System BNA1, known as  System BNA1 LITE has also been created for less demanding games.

Development
Because the N2, ES1(A2), ES2 Plus and ES3 are based on PC architecture, development for it and porting from it is relatively easy and inexpensive.

Specifications

Namco System N2 
 Motherboard: MSI K7N2GM-IL (NVIDIA nForce2 Chipset, Custom BIOS) (Japan/Asia) / ASUS M2N-MX (Export, Standard BIOS)
 CPU: AMD K7 Mobile Athlon XP 2800+ at 2.13 GHz (Socket A/462)  (Japan/Asia) / AMD Athlon 64 3500+ at 2.2 GHz (Socket 939)  (Export)
 RAM: 1×1GB / 2×1GB DDR 400 MHz 3200 MB/s
 GPU: NVIDIA GeForce 4 Series / GeForce 7600 GS AGP with 256/512MB GDDR2 memory (GeForce 7800 GS AGP for some japan region maximum tune N2s)
 Output: 1 DVI port, 1 VGA port, 1 S-Video port
 Storage: Seagate 80GB (Japan/Asia) / WD 80GB PATA IDE HDD (Export)
 Operating System: Linux 32-bit (Debian based)
 Sound: stereo RCA output from front panel audio with external AMP PCB (Audio duplicated to rear speakers by amp)
 Protection: HASP HL Max/RTC USB dongle (v0.06)

Namco System ES1 
 Motherboard: Supermicro C2SBM-Q (Intel Q35 + ICH9DO Chipset)
 CPU: Intel Core 2 Duo E8400 at 3.00 GHz
 RAM: 2×512 MB DDR2 800 MHz 1.8V
 GPU: NVIDIA GeForce 9600 GT PCIe 2.0 x16 with 512 MB GDDR3 memory
 Output: 2 DVI ports / 1 DVI-I port, 1 VGA port, 1 HDMI port
 Storage: Seagate Barracuda 7200.12 160 GB (ST3160318AS) / Hitachi Deskstar 7K1000.C 160 GB (HDS721016CLA382) SATA HDD
 Operating System: arcadelinux 32-bit (Debian 4.0 based)
 Sound: 5.1 channel HD Audio
 Protection: TPM 1.2, HDD copy protection, HASP HL Max USB dongle

Namco System ES1(A2) & ES2 PLUS
 Operating System: Windows Embedded 7

Namco System ES3 
 Motherboard: Super Micro C7B75 with an LGA1155 socket.
 CPU: Intel Core i5-3550S at 3.00 GHz
 RAM: 8 GB DDR3 2400 MHz (Revision B) / 16 GB DDR3 2400 MHz (Revision X)
 GPU: NVIDIA GeForce GTX 650 Ti (Revision B) / GTX 680 (Revision X) PCIe 3.0 x16
 Output: 1 DVI-I port, 1 DVI-D port, 1 HDMI port
 Storage: HGST 250 GB 5400 RPM (HTS545025A7E680) SATA III HDD
 Operating System: Windows Embedded Standard 7
 Sound: Integrated HD Audio
 Protection: HASP HL Max USB dongle, Windows BitLocker

Namco System ES4 
 Operating System: Windows Embedded 7

Namco System BNA1 
 CPU: Intel Core i5-6500 at 3.2Ghz
 GPU: NVIDIA GeForce GTX 1050Ti PCIe 3.0 x16
 Output: 1 Dual-Link DVI-I port, 1 DisplayPort 1.2 port, 1 HDMI 2.0b port
 Storage: innodisk 3ME4 SATA SSD 256 GB
 Operating System: Windows 10 IoT Enterprise 2016 LTSB
 Sound: Integrated HD Audio
 Protection: Thales Group Sentinel HL Max USB dongle, Windows BitLocker

List of System N2 games
 Animal Kaiser: The King of Animal (2008)
 Counter-Strike Neo (2005)
 Mobile Suit Gundam: Bonds of the Battlefield (2007)
 Mobile Suit Gundam: Bonds of the Battlefield Rev.2.00 (2008)
 MotoGP DX (2007)
 New Space Order (2007)
 Wangan Midnight: Maximum Tune 3 (2007)
 Wangan Midnight: Maximum Tune 3DX (2008)
 Wangan Midnight: Maximum Tune 3DX Plus (2010)

List of System ES1 games
 Dead Heat Riders (2013)
 Dead Heat Street Racing / Maximum Heat (2011)
 Nirin (2009)
 Sailor Zombie AKB48 Arcade Edition (2014)
 Tank! Tank! Tank! (2009)
 Wangan Midnight Maximum Tune 4 (2011)
 Wangan Midnight Maximum Tune 5 (North American version) (2017)

List of System ES1(A2) games
 Mobile Suit Gundam: Bonds of the Battlefield Rev.3.00 (2011)
 Wangan Midnight Maximum Tune 4 (Asia(Others)/Indonesia version) (2012)
 Wangan Midnight Maximum Tune 5 (Asia(Others)/Indonesia version) (2015)
 Wangan Midnight Maximum Tune 5 DX (Asia(Others)/Indonesia version) (2016)
 Wangan Midnight Maximum Tune 5 DX Plus (Asia(Others)/Indonesia version) (2017)

List of System ES2 Plus games
 Aikatsu! (2012)
 Hyakujuu Taisen Great Animal Kaiser (2012)

List of System ES3 games
 Lost Land Adventure (2014)
 Mach Storm (2013)
 Mario Kart Arcade GP DX (2013)
 Mobile Suit Gundam: Bonds of the Battlefield Rev.4.00 (2016)
 Mobile Suit Gundam U.C: Card Builder (2016)
 Pokken Tournament (2015)
 Star Wars Battle Pod (2015)
 Synchronica (2015)
 Tekken 7 (2015)
 Tekken 7 Fated Retribution (2016)
 Tekken 7 Fated Retribution ROUND 2 (2019)
 Time Crisis 5 (2015)
 Wangan Midnight Maximum Tune 5 (2014)
 Wangan Midnight Maximum Tune 5 DX (2015)
 Wangan Midnight Maximum Tune 5 DX Plus (2016)
 Wangan Midnight Maximum Tune 6 (2018)
 Wangan Midnight Maximum Tune 6R (2020)

List of System ES4 games
 Point Blank X (2015)

List of System BNA1 games
 Mobile Suit Gundam: Bonds of the Battlefield II (2020)
 Mobile Suit Gundam Extreme Vs. 2 (2018)
 JoJo's Bizarre Adventure: Last Survivor (2019)
 Poker Station (2020)
 Sword Art Online Arcade (2019)
 Wangan Midnight Maximum Tune 6 (Export Version) (2019)

List of System BNA1 LITE games
 Taiko no Tatsujin Nijiiro ver. (2020)
 Mario Kart Arcade GP DX (2013)

Similar Hardware
The Sega Lindbergh, Taito's Taito Type X and Taito Type X+ operate in a similar way to the N2 platform, except that they use other operating systems.

References

Namco arcade system boards